Colin Charles Graham (born 5 August 1957) is a former English cricketer.  Graham was a right-handed batsman who bowled right-arm medium-fast.  He was born in Wendover, Buckinghamshire.

Graham made his debut for Suffolk in the 1980 Minor Counties Championship against Buckinghamshire.  Graham played Minor counties cricket infrequently for Suffolk from 1980 to 1991, which included 19 Minor Counties Championship appearances and 2 MCCA Knockout Trophy matches.  He made his List A debut against Derbyshire in the 1983 NatWest Trophy.  He made 2 further List A appearances, against Worcestershire in the 1984 NatWest Trophy and Lancashire in the 1985 NatWest Trophy.  In his 3 List A matches, he took 3 wickets at an average of 42.00 with best figures of 2/36.

His brother, Ian, also played List A and Minor counties cricket for Suffolk.

References

External links
Colin Graham at ESPNcricinfo
Colin Graham at CricketArchive

1957 births
Living people
People from Wendover
English cricketers
Suffolk cricketers